Frederick Denfeld was a professional American football offensive lineman in the American Professional Football Association and the National Football League. He played two seasons for the Rock Island Independents (1920) and the Duluth Kelleys (1925).

References

1898 births
1990 deaths
Players of American football from Duluth, Minnesota
American football offensive linemen
Rock Island Independents players
Duluth Kelleys players
Navy Midshipmen football players